Koh Eng Tong (1921–2006) was a Malaysian athlete, professional photographer and founder of Eng Tong System Sdn. Bhd, a supplier of professional photographic equipment and other products in Malaysia.  He won the first Commonwealth Games gold medal for Malaya and was instrumental in bringing Malaysian sports to world prominence.

British Empire and the Commonwealth Games 
In 1950, Koh Eng Tong won Malaya's first Gold Medal at the 1950 British Empire Games in Weightlifting (featherweight) held in Auckland, New Zealand. At these games he lifted 310.5 kg (684.5 lbs) to win the featherweight Gold.

Although at the time, Malaya was not yet an independent country, the British Government in Malaya allowed an organised a team of four weightlifters from Malaya to participate for the first time in the Games under the Union Jack. The 1950 games was also the first occasion weightlifting was introduced.  Due to the absence of a sports organisation, the weightlifters had to pay their own expenses to participate at the games. All four lifters medaled, bringing back 2 gold, 1 silver, and 1 bronze.

In 1951, he was rated one of the top ten Featherweight Lifters in the World.

In 1954, due to lack of financial support, Malaya could not participate in the 1954 British Empire and Commonwealth Games held in Vancouver, and Koh was not given an opportunity to defend his title, which might have resulted in a repeat victory.  The 1954 winning weight in the featherweight category was 690 lbs, 5 lbs more than the total achieved by Koh Eng Tong in 1950.

Olympic games 
Malaya was officially recognised by the International Olympic Committee (IOC) in 1954.  Mr. Koh was among a contingent of 33 athletes sent by the Federation of Malaya Olympic Council to participate in the 1956 Summer Olympics in Melbourne.

Although 6 years removed from his gold medal performance at the British Empire games. Mr. Koh represented Malaya in the featherweight weightlifting category. It was the first of two Olympic appearance by the nation under the Malaya name. He lifted 285 kg (628 lbs), well off his personal best during his prime and finish in 17th place.

Hall of Fame 
In 1994, Eng Tong was recognised by the Olympic Council of Malaysia and inducted to the Hall of Fame.
Mr. Koh presented to Olympic Council of Malaysia (OCM) with a classic photo which he took in the 1956 Summer Olympics in Melbourne.

1998 Commonwealth Games 
When Kuala Lumpur hosted the 1998 Commonwealth Games Eng Tong was honoured by becoming the Queen's Baton Relay Final Runner for these games, who at 77 handed the baton which contained the Queen's message to Prince Edward, the Queen's representative and Commonwealth Games Federation president.

The games were the first hosted by an Asian country and for the first time in the history of the games that all 70 Commonwealth countries took part.

References

External links
 

1921 births
2006 deaths
Malaysian people of Chinese descent
Malaysian male weightlifters
Weightlifters at the 1950 British Empire Games
Weightlifters at the 1956 Summer Olympics
Olympic weightlifters of Malaya
Commonwealth Games gold medallists for Malaya
20th-century Malaysian businesspeople
Malaysian photographers
Commonwealth Games medallists in weightlifting
20th-century Malaysian people
21st-century Malaysian people
Medallists at the 1950 British Empire Games